Krastanov Cove (‘Krastanov Zaliv’ \kra-'sta-nov 'za-liv\) is the 1.6 km wide cove indenting for 1.2 km the southwest coast of Elephant Island, South Shetland Islands in Antarctica southeast of Piperkov Point. The feature is “named after Captain Ivan Krastanov, commander of the Bulgarian ocean fishing trawlers Sagita and Fizalia during their fishing trips to Antarctic waters off South Georgia from February to July 1978 and from December 1978 to May 1979 respectively. The Bulgarian fishermen, along with those of the Soviet Union, Poland and East Germany are the pioneers of modern Antarctic fishing industry.”

Location
Its southeast entrance point is situated 7.94 km northwest of Cape Lookout. British mapping of the area in 1822,1972 and 2009.

Maps

 Chart of South Shetland including Coronation Island, &c. from the exploration of the sloop Dove in the years 1821 and 1822 by George Powell Commander of the same. Scale ca. 1:200000. London: Laurie, 1822.
 British Antarctic Territory. Scale 1:200000 topographic map. DOS 610 Series, Sheet W 61 54. Directorate of Overseas Surveys, Tolworth, UK, 1972.
 South Shetland Islands: Elephant, Clarence and Gibbs Islands. Scale 1:220000 topographic map. UK Antarctic Place-names Committee, 2009.
 Antarctic Digital Database (ADD). Scale 1:250000 topographic map of Antarctica. Scientific Committee on Antarctic Research (SCAR). Since 1993, regularly upgraded and updated.

Notes

References
 Krastanov Cove. SCAR Composite Antarctic Gazetteer

External links
 Krastanov Cove. Copernix satellite image

Coves of the South Shetland Islands
Elephant Island
Ocean Fisheries – Burgas Co
Bulgaria and the Antarctic